Viktor Anatolyevich Poddubny (born 30 May 1965) is a Soviet judoka. He competed in the men's half-heavyweight event at the 1988 Summer Olympics.

References

1965 births
Living people
Soviet male judoka
Olympic judoka of the Soviet Union
Judoka at the 1988 Summer Olympics
Sportspeople from Omsk
Universiade gold medalists for the Soviet Union
Universiade medalists in judo
Goodwill Games medalists in judo
Medalists at the 1985 Summer Universiade
Competitors at the 1986 Goodwill Games